Monark is a Swedish bicycle, moped and motorcycle manufacturer.

Monark may also refer to:

Monark (video game), a 2021 video game
Monark Equipment Corporation, a Filipino corporation
Monark Springs, Missouri, U.S.
Monark 540, a sailing yacht
Monark 606, a sailing yacht
International 806, also Monark 806, a sailing yacht
Swedish sailing vessel Monark, sunk in May 1940 by HMS Severn (N57)

See also
 Monarch (disambiguation)
 Quebec City Monarks, the Quebec City Canadian football team
 Monarc Entertainment, an American record label